Gaskell's false serotine (Hesperoptenus gaskelli) is a species of vesper bat. It is found only in Indonesia.

References

Hesperoptenus
Bats of Indonesia
Endangered biota of Asia
Mammals described in 1983
Taxonomy articles created by Polbot